Apollonio di Giovanni di Tomaso (1414 – 1465), was an Italian painter.

Biography
He was born in Florence and is also known as the "Master of the Jarves Cassone". Apollonio di Giovanni was recorded in Florence 1446 where he ran a workshop specialised in producing wedding chests known as cassoni and other such furniture. He died in 1465. He worked in partnership with the woodworker Marco del Buono Giamberti, whose son became Apollonio's pupil and heir.

Works

Apollonio or his surviving atelier as run by Marco del Buono Giamberti
are now credited with the creation of the illuminated golden tarot deck formerly known as the "Charles VI" or "Grigonneur", now normally called "the Estensi" after the noble Italian d'Este family who once owned it. 

Its 17 remaining cards are held by the Bibliothèque nationale de France. From Dec. 2021 to March 2022, the deck was exhibited at the French national playing card museum in Issy with other famous Italian illuminated tarots, such as the Visconti-Sforza tarot, in a show called Tarots Enlumines. 

This masterpiece was further examined in a special technical Study Day conference on March 11, 2022.

References

Apollonio di Giovanni di Tomaso on Artnet

External links
Italian Paintings: Florentine School, a collection catalog containing information about di Tommaso and his works (see pages: 100–105).

1414 births
1465 deaths
15th-century Italian painters
Italian male painters
Painters from Florence
Italian Renaissance painters